Andre Olwagen is a South African rugby league player for the Brakpan Bears. His position is fullback He is a South African international, and has played in the 2013 Rugby League World Cup qualifying against Jamaica and the USA.

References

Olwagen
Olwagen
Brakpan Bears players
Rugby league fullbacks